Eriphus metallicus is a species of beetle in the family Cerambycidae. It was described by Zajciw in 1960.

References

Eriphus
Beetles described in 1960